The Very Best of Robbie Fulks is a compilation album by alternative country musician Robbie Fulks, released on January 18, 2000, on Bloodshot Records. Despite its name, the album is not a greatest hits compilation; instead, it comprises tracks that had never been released on any of Fulks' previous albums. Fulks has said that he thinks the songs on the album correspond to fictional albums of his, such as "I Loathe my Fans" and "Adultery for Beginners".

Release
Fulks was initially only able to release the album over the Internet, because beginning in the summer of 1999, he had not yet been officially released from his contract with Geffen Records. The reason Fulks put the album together and released it was to gain further publicity and, according to Peter Margasak, "give him something to tour behind."

Track listing
 Jean Arthur – 2:44 
 Sleepin' On The Job Of Love – 2:10
 Roots Rock Weirdoes – 3:53
 May The Best Man Win – 2:24
 Hamilton County Breakdown – 2:56 
 Gravid And Tense – 0:30
 Parallel Bars – 3:07
 Love Ain't Nothin' – 2:42 
 I Just Want To Meet The Man – 4:22 
 Wedding Of The Bugs – 1:43
 You Break It, You Pay – 2:23
 White Man's Bourbon – 5:06
 That Bangle Girl – 3:00
 Jello Goodbye – 5:29

References

Robbie Fulks albums
2000 compilation albums
Bloodshot Records albums